The Republic of Ireland national under-19 football team, is the national under-19 football team of the Republic of Ireland and is controlled by the Football Association of Ireland and competes in the biennial European Under-19 Football Championship.

The team has competed in several championships.

Achievements

The Republic won the UEFA European Under-18 Football Championship in Cyprus in 1998 and that remains their best performance to date.

 U-18 European Championship in 1998 – 1st place (Coach Brian Kerr)

In July 2011 Republic of Ireland national under-19 football team reached the semi-finals of the 2011 UEFA European Under-19 Football Championship held in Romania where they were eliminated by Spain.

Honours
 UEFA European Under-19 Football Championship
 Under-19 era, 2002–present
Champions (0): 
Runner-up (0): 
Third Place (0):
Fourth Place (1): 2002
Semi-Finalist (1): 2011, 2019
 Under-18 era, 1957–2001
Champions (1): 1998
Runner-up (0):
Third Place (1): 1999
Fourth Place (2): 1984, 1997

FIFA U-20 World Cup
Champions (0):
Runner-up (0):
Third Place (1): 1997
Fourth Place (0):

Results and fixtures

2021

2022

2023

Players

Current squad
Players born on or after 1 January 2004 are eligible for the 2023 UEFA European Under-19 Championship qualification campaign.

The following players were called up for the three qualifier matches at Ferrycarrig Park in Wexford against Slovakia, Estonia and Greece, on 22, 25 & 28 March 2023.

Caps and goals updated as of 28 September 2022, after the game vs Hungary.

Recent call-ups
The following players have also been called up to the Republic of Ireland under-19 squad in the last 12 months and remain eligible:

U21 With U21 squad
INJ Withdrew from latest squad due to injury
WD Withdrew from latest squad
SUS Player is suspended
COVID Withdrew from latest squad due to Covid-19 protocols

Note: Names in italics denote players that have been capped for the senior team.

See also
 European Under-19 Football Championship
 Republic of Ireland men's national football team
 Republic of Ireland men's national under-21 football team
 Republic of Ireland men's national under-17 football team
 Republic of Ireland women's national football team
 Republic of Ireland women's national under-19 football team
 Republic of Ireland women's national under-17 football team

References

External links
 U19 page on FAI website
 UEFA Under-19 website

Ireland
Under-19
Youth association football in the Republic of Ireland